Wyoming Public Radio (WPR) is the statewide public radio network in Wyoming, and is licensed to the University of Wyoming.

Programming and operation 
Wyoming Public Radio was founded in 1966, and the station's format is similar to that of many other American public radio stations. Although licensed to the University, the network does not produce student-derived programming. Twice a year, in the fall and in the Spring, the station conducts Pledge Drives, which is where a majority of the station's budget comes from.

From the UW campus in Laramie, the network produces local news and music programming, mostly consisting of jazz, classical and adult album alternative music. The network also airs a variety of syndicated programs from National Public Radio, Public Radio Exchange, Native Voice One, and American Public Media. Some NPR, PRX and BBC World Service programming includes Morning Edition, All Things Considered, BBC World Service, and many others.

Wyoming Public Radio also produces Classical Wyoming, a 24-hour classical format.  It is available as an analog radio service in Laramie, Rock Springs and Lander.  It is also available on HD-2 throughout the state.

In September 2016, Wyoming Public Radio launched a fourth radio service named Wyoming Sounds.  Wyoming Sounds is a rock-based format with emphasis on singer-songwriters and a wide variety of styles including acoustic, folk, blues, soul, reggae, world and Americana music.  It is carried as an analog radio service in Laramie, Torrington, Lander, Riverton and Worland.  It is also available on HD-3 channels throughout the state.  Its website is wyomingsounds.org.

WPR is the only public radio network produced in Wyoming. Other public radio networks and stations (including Yellowstone Public Radio, KUER-FM, KUNC, and KUVO) also reach into parts of the state.

Stations 

 Notes

Wyoming Sounds 
Wyoming Public Media operates an adult album alternative network, branded Wyoming Sounds.

Two of the transmitters in this network, KTWY and KXWY, were previously commercial licenses held by Cochise Broadcasting which only broadcast periodically to maintain their licenses. In 2017, the FCC entered into a consent decree with Cochise by which it surrendered these stations, KWWY (in the Classical Wyoming network), and other stations for donation to other entities. KNWT operated independently from 2009 to 2017 as a service of Northwest College in Powell.

Classical Wyoming 
Three stations air their own programming, consisting mostly of classical music:

KUWL 
KUWL airs its own programming, consisting mostly of jazz music:

Some of the affiliates are broadcasting digitally via HD Radio, with a subchannel consisting of full-time classical music, mostly from the Classical 24 network.

See also
 Wyoming Public Television

References

External links 
 

 University of Wyoming
 Online Streaming - Main Service
 Online Streaming - Classical Wyoming
 Online Streaming - Jazz Wyoming

 
HD Radio stations
NPR member networks
American radio networks